Total Eclipse is the third studio album by American hip hop group Black Moon. It was released on October 7, 2003 through Duck Down Music. Recording sessions took place at the Dewgarde Crib of Hits in New York, at Tha Entaprize, at CDR Studios, and at D.I.R.T. Factory in Norfolk. Production was primarily handled by Da Beatminerz, as well as Dan The Man, Coptic, DJ Static, Kleph Dollaz, MoSS, Nottz, Oshta Hunter and Tone Capone. It features guest appearances from Smif-N-Wessun, Sean Price and Starang Wondah.

Released one year after the Boot Camp Clik's return with The Chosen Few, the album received generally positive reviews from music critics and humble sales, peaking at number 47 on the Top R&B/Hip-Hop Albums and number 23 on the Independent Albums in the US. The album features the singles "Stay Real" and "This Goes Out to You", as well as the bonus track "Rush", a single that was released on January 7, 2003 and included on the Collect Dis Edition compilation.

Track listing

Notes
 signifies a co-producer
 signifies an additional producer
Track 3 features background vocals by Nadine Michel
Track 16 features additional vocals by Charon Aldredge

Sample credits
Track 1 contains a sample of the recording "Seed of Love" as performed by Little Boy Blues

Personnel
Kenyatta "Buckshot" Blake – main artist, vocals, executive producer
Kasim "5ft" Reid – main artist, vocals (tracks: 1, 3, 8, 14)
Ewart "DJ Evil Dee" Dewgarde – main artist, scratches (tracks: 8-10, 14), mixing (track 1), recording (tracks: 1, 8, 9, 11, 13-15, 17), producer

Sean Price – vocals (tracks: 2, 11)
Darrell "Steele" Yates Jr. – vocals (tracks: 5, 13)
Tekomin "Tek" Williams – vocals (tracks: 5, 15, 16)
Jack "Starang Wondah" McNair – vocals (track 6)
Nadine Michel – background vocals (track 3)
Charon Aldredge – additional vocals (track 16)
Ariel "A-Train" Levine – guitar (track 3)
DJ Terrell Rockwell – scratches (track 8)
Da Beatminerz – producers (tracks: 1, 5, 7, 8, 9-11, 13-15, 17), mixing (track 13)
Jason "MoSS" Connoy – producer (track 2)
Dan "The Man" Humiston – co-producer (track 3), producer (track 7), additional producer (tracks: 14, 16), recording (tracks: 1, 4, 8, 11, 13-16)
Anthony "Tone Capone" Gilmour – producer (track 3)
Sean "DJ Static" Moore – producer (track 4)
Dominick "Nottz" Lamb – producer (track 6)
Darrel "Kleph Dollaz" Durant – producer (track 12)
Eric "Coptic" Matlock – producer (track 16)
Oshta Hunter – producer (track 16)
Drew "Dru-Ha" Friedman – executive producer
Rob "Giambi" Garcia – recording (tracks: 2, 3, 5, 8, 12, 14, 16)
Chris Brown – recording (tracks: 3, 13, 15, 16) 
Walter "Mr. Walt" Dewgarde – recording (track 5)
Buttah L – assistant recording (track 17)
Michael Sarsfield – mastering
Javad – art direction, photography
Steve P – art direction
Akash Khokha – layout
Brandon Teitel – marketing

Charts

References

External links

2003 albums
Duck Down Music albums
Albums produced by MoSS
Albums produced by Nottz
Black Moon (group) albums
Albums produced by Da Beatminerz